A missal is a Christian liturgical book.

Missal may also refer to:

Religion
Anglican Missal, anglo-catholic liturgical book
English Missal, anglo-catholic liturgical book
Leofric Missal, illuminated medieval English sacramentary
Roman Missal, liturgical book of the Roman Rite
Stowe Missal, illuminated medieval Irish sacramentary

Other
Missal, Paraná, a municipality in Brazil
Stephen Missal (born 1948), American artist